Nicothoidae is a family of copepods, containing the following genera:

Arhizorhina Bamber & Boxshall, 2006
Aspidoecia Giard & Bonnier, 1889
Cephalorhiza Boxshall & Harrison, 1988
Choniomyzon Pillai, 1962
Choniorhiza Boxshall & Lincoln, 1983
Choniosphaera Connolly, 1929
Choniostoma Hansen, 1886
Diexanthema Ritchie, 1975
Hadrothoe Humes, 1975
Hansenulus Heron & Damkaer, 1986
Homoeoscelis Hansen, 1897
Mysidion Hansen, 1897
Neomysidion Ohtsuka, Boxshall & Harada, 2005
Nicorhiza Lincoln & Boxshall, 1983
Nicothoe Audouin & H. Milne-Edwards, 1825
Paranicothoe Carton, 1970
Rhizorhina Hansen, 1892
Sphaeronella Salensky, 1868
Sphaeronelloides Bradford, 1975
Sphaeronellopsis Hansen, 1904
Stenothocheres Hansen, 1897

References 

Siphonostomatoida
Crustacean families